Viloria de Rioja is a municipality located in the province of Burgos, Castile and León, Spain. According to the 2014 census (INE), the municipality has a population of 41 inhabitants. It was the birthplace of Saint Dominic de la Calzada, in 1019.

References

Municipalities in the Province of Burgos